KF Djelmnia Shkodrane is an Albanian professional football club based in Shkodër. They last competed in the Albanian Third Division.

See also
List of football clubs in Albania

References

Djelmnia